The 2023 ABL Invitational was the eleventh season of competition of the ASEAN Basketball League. The regular season tipped off on 2 January in Singapore, before moving to 3 other host countries. The season ended with the finals played from 3rd to 15th March. The 2023 season featured eight teams from the region.

Teams
2019–20 ABL season participants Formosa Dreamers, Taipei Fubon Braves,  Mono Vampire, Alab Pilipinas, Macau Wolf Warriors and the Kuala Lumpur Dragons did not participate for the 2023 season.

Personnel

Imports
All teams can register a maximum of 3 foreigners and 1 heritage player. The salary cap for the foreign players is set at US$ 20,000 per month.

Regular season
The regular season announced a new format. There will be four rolling tournaments before the lead up to best-of-three semi-finals and finals. At the end of the four tournaments, each team would have played one another twice, and a total of 14 matches. The top four teams would advance to the semi-finals. The second leg will be in Batam, Indonesia, third leg in Kuala Lumpur, Malaysia and the fourth leg in Ho Chi Minh City, Vietnam. The semi final and final will be held also in Ho Chi Minh City, Vietnam.

Tournaments

Standings

Results

Bracket

Semi-finals
The semi-final is a best-of-three series with game 3 being played if necessary.

(1) Saigon Heat vs. (4) Singapore Slingers

(2) Hong Kong Eastern vs. (3) NS Matrix

Final: (1) Saigon Heat vs. (2) Hong Kong Eastern
The final is a best-of-three series with game 3 being played if necessary.

Awards

Finals awards

End-of-season awards 
The winners were announced after Game 3 of the 2023 ABL Finals at the Nguyễn Du Indoor Stadium, Ho Chi Minh City, Vietnam.

Defensive Player of the Year: Chris McLaughlin (Hong Kong Eastern)
Coach of the Year: Željko Pavličević (Hong Kong Eastern)

References

External links
 Official website

 
2022–23 in Asian basketball leagues
2023